Thelma & Louise is a 1991 American film directed by Ridley Scott and written by Callie Khouri. The film has elements of multiple genres and has been described as a drama, adventure or road movie with elements of a romantic comedy. It stars Susan Sarandon as Louise and Geena Davis as Thelma, two friends who embark on a road trip that ends up in unforeseen circumstances. Filming took place in California and Utah from June to August 1990. The supporting cast include Harvey Keitel, Michael Madsen, Christopher McDonald, and Brad Pitt in one of his first major film roles. 
 
The film was a critical and commercial success, receiving six Academy Award nominations and winning for Best Original Screenplay. Scott was nominated for Best Director, and both Sarandon and Davis were nominated for Best Actress. To date, this is the most recent film to have two actors nominated in the same category for either Best Actor or Best Actress. It influenced other films and artistic works and became a landmark of feminist film.

In 2016, the United States Library of Congress selected the film for preservation in the National Film Registry, finding it "culturally, historically, or aesthetically significant".

Plot 

Best friends Thelma Dickinson and Louise Sawyer set out for a weekend vacation at a fishing cabin in the mountains to take a break from their dreary lives in Arkansas. Thelma, a housewife, is married to disrespectful and controlling carpet salesman Darryl, while sharp-tongued Louise works as a waitress in a diner and is dating easygoing musician Jimmy, who is on the road most of the time.

On the way, they stop at a roadhouse bar, where Thelma dances with a flirtatious stranger, Harlan. He takes her to the parking lot and tries to rape her until Louise intervenes and threatens to shoot him. As the women walk away, Harlan yells vulgarities at them, so Louise shoots him in a fit of rage.

At a motel they discuss how to handle the situation. Thelma wants to go to the police, but Louise fears that no one will believe a claim of attempted rape as Thelma was drinking and dancing with Harlan and also having no evidence of the rape, and they will be charged with murder. They decide to flee to Mexico, but Louise demands they travel there without going through Texas, as something happened to her there that she refuses to reveal. Heading west, they come across an attractive young drifter, J.D., to whom Thelma takes a liking. Louise contacts Jimmy, asking him to wire her life savings to her. He surprises her by delivering the money in person, and they spend the night together. Jimmy proposes to Louise, but she refuses. Thelma invites J.D. to her room, and they sleep together. She learns he is a convicted armed-robber who has violated the terms of his parole.

The following morning, they discover J.D. has stolen Louise's life savings and fled. Louise is distraught, so a guilty Thelma takes charge and later robs a nearby convenience store using tactics she learned from J.D.. Meanwhile, the FBI closes in on them after witnesses at the bar identify Louise's 1966 Ford Thunderbird convertible. Their whereabouts are also questioned by the owner of the fishing cabin after they failed to arrive.

Arkansas State Police Investigator Hal Slocumb, leading the investigation, questions both J.D. (who was caught) and Jimmy, and taps into the phone line at Darryl's house. He sympathizes with the pair's situation and understands why they did not report Harlan's killing (partly due to Louise's own experience in Texas). During a few brief phone conversations with Louise, Hal expresses his sympathy but is unsuccessful in persuading her to surrender.

Thelma tells Louise she understands if she wants to go back home, knowing she has Jimmy waiting for her, but explains she cannot go back to Darryl. Louise promises they will keep going together. While back on the road, Thelma recalls the incident with Harlan and tries to ask Louise if what happened with Harlan was what happened to Louise in Texas. Louise responds angrily and tells Thelma to never bring it up again.

Later, they are pulled over by a New Mexico state trooper for speeding. Knowing he will soon discover they are wanted for murder and armed robbery, Thelma holds him at gunpoint and locks him in the trunk of his police car. Driving further west, they encounter a foul-mouthed truck driver who repeatedly makes obscene gestures at them. They pull over and demand an apology from him; when he refuses, they fire at his fuel tanker, causing it to explode. The women leave him stranded in the desert furious with the tanker's wreckage.

Thelma and Louise are finally cornered by the authorities only one hundred yards from the edge of the Grand Canyon. Hal arrives on the scene, but the women refuse his last chance to talk them into surrendering. Rather than be captured, Thelma proposes that they "keep going". Louise asks Thelma if she is certain, and Thelma says yes. They kiss and then hold hands, Louise steps on the gas, and, as Hal desperately pursues them on foot, they accelerate over the cliff to their presumed deaths.

Cast
 Susan Sarandon as Louise Sawyer
 Geena Davis as Thelma Dickinson
 Harvey Keitel as Arkansas State Police Detective Hal Slocumb
 Michael Madsen as Jimmy Lennox
 Christopher McDonald as Darryl Dickinson
 Stephen Tobolowsky as FBI Agent Max
 Brad Pitt as J.D.
 Timothy Carhart as Harlan Puckett
 Jason Beghe as State Trooper
 Lucinda Jenney as Lena, The Waitress
 Marco St. John as Truck Driver (uncredited)

Credits adapted from American Film Institute.

Production

Development 

The idea for Thelma & Louise originated in the spring of 1988 when Callie Khouri, then a music video producer, was driving home from work to her apartment in Santa Monica. She spent the following six months working on her first screenplay, which was noted to have drawn inspiration from her own experience as well as her friendship with country music singer Pam Tillis. She had intended it to be a low-budget independent film, directed by herself and produced by fellow music video producer Amanda Temple (wife of English filmmaker Julien Temple). After shopping the project around and finding no takers, Temple showed the script to her friend Mimi Polk Gitlin, who ran Ridley Scott's Percy Main Productions (later Scott Free Productions). Gitlin in turn showed the script to Scott, who expressed great enthusiasm for the project. He agreed to produce the film and bought the film rights for $500,000. Pathé Entertainment, then led by Scott's friend and collaborator Alan Ladd Jr., came on board as a co-producer and financier.

Scott considered four people for the role of director, all of whom turned down the opportunity. Per Gitlin's recollection, three of the candidates were Bob Rafelson, Kevin Reynolds and Richard Donner. Scott was reluctant to direct the film himself but eventually took on the role, having been persuaded by Michelle Pfeiffer.

Casting 

Michelle Pfeiffer and Jodie Foster were originally chosen for the leads; both accepted their roles with enthusiasm. As pre-production of the film dragged on, the two eventually dropped out, with Pfeiffer going on to star in Love Field and Foster in The Silence of the Lambs. Meryl Streep and Goldie Hawn then offered to play the leads, but Streep later dropped out due to scheduling conflicts while Hawn was not considered right for the part. Geena Davis (who had been vigorously pursuing the lead role for nearly a year) and Susan Sarandon were ultimately chosen. The two took extensive driving and shooting lessons in preparation for their roles.

Scott personally convinced Harvey Keitel to take on the role of Hal, the sympathetic Arkansas detective. The two had previously collaborated in Scott's feature directorial debut, the 1977 film The Duellists. Davis recommended her ex-boyfriend Christopher McDonald for the role of Darryl, Thelma's controlling husband. Scott wanted Michael Madsen for Harlan, Thelma's would-be rapist, but Madsen was unwilling; he eventually won the role of Jimmy, Louise's boyfriend. Brad Pitt auditioned for the hustler J.D.; however, the part originally went to Billy Baldwin. Pitt eventually secured the role after both Baldwin and his replacement dropped out. George Clooney, Robert Downey Jr., Mark Ruffalo, Grant Show, John Mellencamp, Dylan McDermott, James LeGros and Dermot Mulroney were also considered for the role of J.D. Davis did test scenes with Clooney, Show, Ruffalo and Pitt; her advice to the directors was to choose Pitt.

Filming 

Principal photography for Thelma & Louise began on June 11, 1990, and concluded on August 31, 1990. Although the setting for the film is a fictional route between Arkansas and the Grand Canyon, it was filmed almost entirely in the states of California and Utah. The primary filming locations were rural areas around Bakersfield, California and Moab, Utah. The Grand Canyon scenes were filmed just south of Dead Horse Point State Park in Utah. Parts of the film were also shot at Shafer Overlook, Monument Valley, La Sal Mountains, La Sal Junction, Cisco, Old Valley City Reservoir, Thompson Springs, Arches National Park, and Crescent Junction in Utah.

Soundtrack 

Pete Haycock on slide guitar contributed to Thunderbird, the theme music for the film. In addition to Glenn Frey's "Part of Me, Part of You", which became the film's primary theme song, the soundtrack included songs performed by Chris Whitley ("Kick The Stones"), Martha Reeves ("Wild Night" written by Van Morrison), Toni Childs ("House Of Hope"), Marianne Faithfull ("Ballad of Lucy Jordan" written by Shel Silverstein), Charlie Sexton ("Badlands"), Grayson Hugh ("I Can't Untie You From Me"), B.B. King ("Better Not Look Down" written by Joe Sample & Will Jennings), Michael McDonald ("No Lookin' Back"), The Temptations ("The Way You Do The Things You Do" written by Smokey Robinson & Bobby Rogers), and Johnny Nash ("I Can See Clearly Now").

Release 

Thelma & Louise was screened out of competition as the closing film at the 1991 Cannes Film Festival. Theatrical release was delayed due to financial turmoil at MGM-Pathé. The film eventually opened in American theaters on May 24, 1991 and was a box-office success, grossing $45 million within the country.

In February 2023, The Criterion Collection announced the film would be joining the collection in May that year.

Reception 

The film received critical acclaim. Janet Maslin of The New York Times had only praise for the film in her review:

Roger Ebert also praised the film but withheld a perfect score on the basis of "the last shot before the titles begin. It's a freeze frame that fades to white, which is fine, except it does so with unseemly haste .... It's unsettling to get involved in a movie that takes 128 minutes to bring you to a payoff that the filmmakers seem to fear."

After watching the film, singer-songwriter Tori Amos wrote "Me and a Gun", the story of her rape several years earlier.

The final scene, where the two embrace before committing suicide by driving off a cliff, has become iconic. Numerous homages and parodies of the scene have appeared, including alternate film endings, cartoon parodies, video game "Easter eggs", and as a tragic ending to television series, music videos, and commercials.

The film also received harsh criticism from those who thought it was biased against men and that its depictions of men were unfairly negative.

On review aggregator Rotten Tomatoes, the film holds an approval rating of 86% based on 147 reviews, with an average rating of 7.9/10. The website's critical consensus reads, "Simultaneously funny, heartbreaking, and peppered with action, Ridley Scott's Thelma & Louise is a potent, well-acted road movie that transcends the feminist message at its core." On Metacritic, the film received a score of 88 based on 12 reviews, indicating "universal acclaim".

The film placed second to The Silence of the Lambs as the best film of 1991 in a poll of 81 critics.

Feminism 

Numerous critics and writers have remarked on the strong feminist overtones of Thelma & Louise. Film critic B. Ruby Rich praises the film as an uncompromising validation of women's experiences, while Kenneth Turan calls it a "neo-feminist road movie". In her essay "The Daughters of Thelma and Louise", Jessica Enevold argues that the film constitutes "an attack on conventional patterns of chauvinist male behavior toward females". In addition, it "exposes the traditional stereotyping of male–female relationships" while rescripting the typical gender roles of the road movie genre.

In her review for the Los Angeles Times, film critic Sheila Benson objects to the characterization of the film as feminist, arguing that it is more preoccupied with revenge and violence than feminist values.

In his review for the New York Post, film critic Kyle Smith describes the film as "a misogynist tale about unbelievably ditzy women who lose what remains of their reason under pressure and suffer the ultimate punishment." Smith's review focused on the terrible decisions these female characters make throughout the entire film.

In an article commemorating the film's 20th anniversary in 2011, Raina Lipsitz called it "the last great film about women" and said that it heralded the achievements of women that caused 1992 to become "the year of the woman". However, she also said that women-themed films have since been losing ground.

Accolades 

The British Film Institute published a book about the film in 2000 as part of a Modern Classics series. On the Writers Guild of America Award's list of 101 best screenplays, it made No.72.

Notes

References

Works cited

Further reading

External links 

 
 
 
 
 
 
 Thelma & Louise at The Numbers
 

1990s adventure comedy-drama films
1990s buddy comedy-drama films
1990s chase films
1990s crime comedy-drama films
1990s road comedy-drama films
1990s female buddy films
1990s feminist films
1991 drama films
1991 films
American adventure comedy-drama films
American buddy comedy-drama films
American chase films
American female buddy films
American feminist films
American black comedy films
American crime comedy-drama films
1990s English-language films
Fictional duos
Films about murderers
Films about rape in the United States
Films about suicide
Films directed by Ridley Scott
Films scored by Hans Zimmer
Films set in Arizona
Films set in Arkansas
Films set in New Mexico
Films set in Oklahoma
Films shot in California
Films shot in Utah
Films whose writer won the Best Original Screenplay Academy Award
Girls with guns films
Metro-Goldwyn-Mayer films
Midlife crisis films
United States National Film Registry films
1990s American films